Donnelay is a commune in the Moselle department in Grand Est in north-eastern France.

Notable people
 

 Michel Alcan (1810–1877), French engineer, politician, and author

See also
 Communes of the Moselle department
 Parc naturel régional de Lorraine

References

External links
 

Communes of Moselle (department)